Claude Debussy completed his String Quartet in G minor, Op. 10 (L.91), in 1893 when he was 31 years old. It is Debussy's only string quartet.

Background
That year Debussy had abandoned the opera Rodrigue et Chimène. He planned to write two string quartets, only one of which materialized. The string quartet was to be dedicated to composer Ernest Chausson, whose personal reservations eventually diverted the composer's original intentions.

The quartet received its premiere on December 29, 1893 by the Ysaÿe Quartet at the Société Nationale in Paris to mixed reactions.

Analysis
The work is in four movements:

Its sensuality and impressionistic tonal shifts are emblematic of its time and place while, with its cyclic structure, it constitutes a final divorce from the rules of classical harmony and points the way ahead. After its premiere, composer Guy Ropartz described the quartet as "dominated by the influence of young Russia (Debussy's patroness in the early 1880s had been Nadezhda von Meck, better known for her support of Tchaikovsky); there are poetic themes, rare sonorities, the first two movements being particularly remarkable."

Debussy wrote that "Any sounds in any combination and in any succession are henceforth free to be used in a musical continuity." Pierre Boulez said that Debussy freed chamber music from "rigid structure, frozen rhetoric and rigid aesthetics."

Maurice Ravel, an Impressionist composer associated with Debussy, also wrote a single string quartet, a piece that is modeled on Debussy's.

References
Citations

Bibliography
 Liner notes by Robert Orledge to Recording of the Quartet by Belcea Quartet

External links
 
 Performance of String Quartet by the Borromeo String Quartet from the Isabella Stewart Gardner Museum in MP3 format
 'Debussy Quartet in G minor, Op. 10', lecture by Roger Parker followed by a performance by the Badke Quartet, at Gresham College, 29 January 2008 (available for download as either video or audio files).
 Notes by Ong Yong Hui (archived via Internet Archive)
 Notes by Keith Anderson

Chamber music by Claude Debussy
Debussy
1893 compositions